Tales from Two Cities: Travel of Another Sort is a book by Irish author Dervla Murphy. It was first published by John Murray in 1987.

Summary
Tales from Two Cities describes Murphy's time living in Bradford and Birmingham in inter-racial communities. She discusses British race relations and includes an account of the 1985 Handsworth riots.

Critical reception
In her review for The Observer, Kirsty Milne felt the book should not have been written in the first place, noting the "unfortunate" implications that arise from a white person like Murphy writing about black communities. Still, Milne thought that Murphy's efforts were well-intentioned albeit tone-deaf. On the other hand, Trevor Fishlock wrote in his review for The Daily Telegraph that the book was a "brave" and "thought-provoking" examination of the race relations in these communities.

References

External links
 

1987 non-fiction books
John Murray (publishing house) books
Books by Dervla Murphy